André Luís Guimarães Fonseca (born 4 March 1969), also commonly known as Ratto, is a Brazilian former professional basketball player and coach.

Career
With the senior Brazilian national basketball team, Ratto He at the 1994 FIBA World Cup, the 1996 Summer Olympics, and the 1998 FIBA World Cup. After his basketball playing career ended, Ratto began a career working as a basketball coach.

References

External links
 
FIBA Profile
CBB Profile 

1969 births
Living people
Basketball players at the 1996 Summer Olympics
Brazilian basketball coaches
Brazilian men's basketball players
CR Vasco da Gama basketball players
Flamengo basketball players
Mogi das Cruzes Basquete players
Olympic basketball players of Brazil
Point guards
Sportspeople from Salvador, Bahia
UniCEUB/BRB players
Unitri/Uberlândia basketball coaches
1994 FIBA World Championship players